"Give It to Me Right" is a song by Canadian R&B singer Melanie Fiona from her debut album, The Bridge (2009). Written and produced by Andrea Martin and Rod Argent, the track was sent to radio outlets as the album's lead single on February 28, 2009. It samples the 1969 hit "Time of the Season" by the Zombies.

The music video for "Give It to Me Right" ranked at number 74 on BET's Notarized: Top 100 Videos of 2009 countdown.

Charts

Weekly charts

Year-end charts

References

2009 debut singles
Music videos directed by Anthony Mandler
Songs written by Rod Argent
Melanie Fiona songs
Songs written by Andrea Martin (musician)
2009 songs
SRC Records singles